Tropical Storm Nicholas was a long-lived tropical storm in October and November of the 2003 Atlantic hurricane season. Forming from a tropical wave on October 13 in the central tropical Atlantic Ocean, Nicholas developed slowly due to moderate levels of wind shear throughout its lifetime. After moving west-northwestward for much of its lifetime, it turned northward and weakened due to increasing shear. The storm again turned to the west and briefly restrengthened, but after turning again to the north Nicholas transitioned to an extratropical cyclone on October 24. As an extratropical storm, Nicholas executed a large loop to the west, and after moving erratically for a week and organizing into a tropical low, it was absorbed by a non-tropical low. The low continued westward, crossed Florida, and ultimately dissipated over the Gulf Coast of the United States on November 5.

Nicholas had no impact as a tropical cyclone, and impact from the low that absorbed the storm was limited to rainfall, gusty winds, and rough surf. Nicholas extended the above-average levels of tropical cyclone activity throughout the 2003 season, and was one of fourteen seasons to reach fourteen storms. The low that absorbed the storm nearly developed into a tropical cyclone itself, but moderate wind shear prevented that from happening.

Meteorological history

The origin of Tropical Storm Nicholas can be traced to a tropical wave that moved off the coast of Africa on October 9. It moved westward, and developed a broad area of low pressure along the wave on October 10. As upper-level winds became more favorable, the system became better organized, though the circulation center initially remained located to the west of the area of heavy showers.

Located within an area of moderate southwesterly wind shear, the depression was slow to organize; early on October 14, a clear center was not depicted on Infrared satellite imagery. On October 15, deep convection became much better organized, though the center of Nicholas remained displaced from the deepest of the shower activity. Despite the shear, the storm continued to strengthen as it moved to the west-northwest, a motion caused by a mid-level ridge to its north. On October 16, Nicholas transitioned from a sheared, unorganized system to a more organized system, as a result of banding features and improvement in its convective pattern due to lesser amounts of vertical shear and a healthier anticyclone over the storm. Dvorak estimates suggested Nicholas potentially attained hurricane status, though microwave images of the storm showed a sheared system without any evidence of an eye feature.

Shortly after peaking in strength, Nicholas weakened due to increasing southwesterly wind shear, and the center of circulation briefly became exposed from the deep convection. In response to a break in the subtropical ridge, the storm turned to the north on October 18. Nicholas turned more to the west on October 20, and later on the winds in the storm decreased to minimal storm strength. Convection diminished greatly, though Nicholas unexpectedly re-strengthened as deep convection refired. Nicholas tracked northward in response to a break in the subtropical ridge, and on October 24, after degenerating to a remnant low pressure area, Nicholas lost what tropical characteristics it retained and transitioned into an extratropical cyclone. The remnant storm executed a large anticyclonic loop, resulting in a westward motion and a brief re-intensification into an extratropical storm on October 29. The storm continued to the west along a warm front associated with a non-tropical low to its southwest, and executed a second anticyclonic loop to the south. On October 30, convection increased over the low-level circulation of what was left to Nicholas, and the National Hurricane Center indicated a potential for tropical or subtropical development as it moved towards warmer waters. The system executed a small cyclonic loop, and on October 31 the system organized into a tropical low. It turned westward towards a non-tropical low, and on November 1 the remnants of Nicholas was absorbed by the low.

On November 1, convection increased in the complex system that absorbed the remnants of Nicholas, and the National Hurricane Center indicated the system could develop into a tropical or subtropical cyclone at any time. The low continued quickly westward, generating only sporadic convection, and crossed Florida on November 3. After entering the Gulf of Mexico, it turned to the west-northwest, and without organizing it made landfall in southeast Louisiana on November 4. It continued inland, and quickly weakened over Louisiana and Mississippi on November 5.

Impact, records, and naming
The non-tropical low that absorbed Nicholas dropped locally heavy rainfall across the Bahamas and southern Florida, as well as in portions of the northern Gulf Coast. The low also resulted in two to four foot (0.6 to 1.2 m) swells along the East Coast of the United States. Overall, no damage or deaths were associated with Nicholas or the low that absorbed it.

Operationally, the National Hurricane Center determined if the non-tropical low that absorbed Nicholas developed into a tropical or subtropical storm, it would be named Odette. In post-season analysis, the center considered classifying the system as an unnumbered tropical depression, though lack of sufficient characteristics of a tropical depression prevented the classification. If Nicholas had attained hurricane status, it would have been one of eight tropical cyclones to reach hurricane status in October in the deep tropical Atlantic since 1900.

See also

 Other storms of the same name
 Timeline of the 2003 Atlantic hurricane season

References

External links

 NHC's archive on Tropical Storm Nicholas
 

2003 Atlantic hurricane season
Atlantic tropical storms
Nicholas